Dr. Achille Rivolta (1908 – 30 May 1992) was a philatelist who signed the Roll of Distinguished Philatelists at Buxton in 1968.

References

1992 deaths
Italian philatelists
1908 births
Fellows of the Royal Philatelic Society London
Signatories to the Roll of Distinguished Philatelists